Anton Kazarnovski (born January 21, 1985) is an Israeli-Russian professional basketball player for Jazine Arbanasi of the second-tier Prva muška liga.

He is 6' 9" (206 cm) tall, and weighs 220 pounds (100 kg). He played for the Israeli U-16, U-18, U-20, U-21, and University National Teams.

He grew up playing with the Maccabi Tel Aviv junior team. In 2003-04, he played one game for Maccabi Tel Aviv.

In 2019-20, playing for KK Pelister Sport Bitola of the Ma Superleague, he averaged 17 points per game. Kazarnovski began the 2021-22 season with Bashkimi Prizren, averaging 13.4 points, 7.3 rebounds, and 2.1 assists per game. On March 1, 2022, he signed with KK Angeli.

References

External links
 אופס! תקלה
 
 Anton Kazarnovski
 Basketball News, Scores, Stats, Analysis, Standings - eurobasket
 KAZARNOVSKI, ANTON - Welcome to 7DAYS EuroCup
 IBBA

1985 births
Living people
Basketball players from Moscow
Basketball League of Serbia players
CSU Asesoft Ploiești players
FC Bayern Munich basketball players
BG Karlsruhe players
Giessen 46ers players
Hapoel Eilat basketball players
Hapoel Galil Elyon players
Hapoel Gilboa Galil Elyon players
Ironi Ramat Gan players
Israeli men's basketball players
Israeli expatriate basketball people in Serbia
KK Sloboda Užice players
Maccabi Tel Aviv B.C. players
Russian men's basketball players
Russian expatriate basketball people in Serbia
Centers (basketball)
Russian emigrants to Israel
KK Jazine Arbanasi players
Bashkimi Prizren players
Apollon Patras B.C. players
Israeli expatriate basketball people in Germany